is a city in Ōita Prefecture, Japan. The modern city of Yufu was established on October 1, 2005, from the merger of the towns of Hasama, Shōnai, and Yufuin (all from Ōita District). , the city has an estimated population of 33,120, and a population density of 104 persons per km². The total area is 319.32 km².

Geography
Yufu is located in central Ōita Prefecture, surrounded by mountains, such as Yufudake (1,583 m), Shirogatake, and Tokiyama. The Ōita River created an alluvial fan, where farming is done. Part of the city is named as a portion of Aso Kujū National Park. Also, Yufu is known for its many hot springs.

Rivers
 Ōita River
 Yufu River
 Iwaki River

Lakes
 Lake Kinrin
 Lake Yamashita

Neighboring municipalities
 Ōita
 Beppu
 Usa
 Taketa
 Kusu
 Kujū

Climate
Yufu has a humid subtropical climate (Köppen climate classification Cfa) with hot summers and cool winters. Precipitation is significant throughout the year, but is somewhat lower in winter.

Demographics
Per Japanese census data, the population of Yufu in 2020 is 32,772 people. Yufu has been conducting censuses since 1920.

History

 1889: Villages Anan, Higashishōnai, Nishishōnai, Minamishōnai, Asono, Tani, Yufugawa, Yunohira, Iwakigawa, and Hasama are created in Ōita District. Kitayufu, Minamiyufu, and Yunohira are created in Hayami District.
 1899: Yunohira village is moved to Ōita District.
 1936: Minamiyufu and Kitayufu are merged, creating Yufuin village.
 1948: Yufuin village is renamed Yufuin town.
 1950: Yufuin town is moved to Ōita District.
 1954: Hasama, Tani, Yufugawa, and Iwakigawa is merged, now named Hasama village. A month later, Anan, Asono, Higashishōnai, Minamishōnai, and Nishishōnai are united. It is named Shōnai village.
 1955: Yufuin and Yunohira are merged. The new town is named Yufuin, but the character for "Yu" is different from the one before. In the same year, Shōnai village is renamed Shōnai town and Hasama village is renamed Hasama town.
 2005: Hasama, Shōnai, and Yufuin are united, the new city named Yufu.

References

External links

 
  

Cities in Ōita Prefecture